Meeia Foo, is a Taiwan-based Malaysian singer who rose to fame after participating in "Super Idol" (超級偶像), a Taiwanese singing competition.

Performances in main singing competitions
 2004 Malaysian Idol I (大馬偶像I) – Top 33
 2005 Astro Star Quest (Astro Talent Quest/Astro新秀大赛)- runner-up
 2005 TVB8 International Chinese New Talent Singing Championship (TVB8全球華人新秀歌唱大賽)- runner-up, perfect sound awards
 2008 Super Idol I (超級偶像I)
 2009 Super Idol II (超級偶像II) -runner-up
 2009 Super Idol III (超級偶像III)
 2010 I Am The One (非同凡響)

2004 Malaysian Idol Season 1  ~held in Malaysia

2005 Astro Star Quest ~held in Malaysia

2005 TVB8 International Chinese New Talent Singing Championship ~held in Hong Kong

2008 Super Idol I ~held in Taiwan

2009 Super Idol II ~held in Taiwan

2009 Super Idol III ~held in Taiwan

2010 I Am The One ~held in Zhejiang, China

Discography

Concert

Achievements & Awards

TV Shows

References 

Meeia Foo's Discography
– 娛樂頻道- 北美新浪
亞洲週刊專訪：人氣歌手符瓊音
11女歌手接力唱 符琼音抱恙唱响爱情
忆起出道经历 符琼音激动飙泪
符琼音： 谢谢伯乐宣明智
Singer Meeia Foo's boyfriend is her worst critic
Meeia Foo is the 'Pink Tank'! '粉红坦克' 符琼音个人专访 on MSN Video
谁把非同凡响硬生生毁成了今年的快男？
台視、三立 超級偶像Super idol
「超偶2」六強誕生 林吟蔚、符瓊音減肥有成 笑稱醜小鴨變天鵝
第二届《Astro华丽台电视剧大奖2005》
2010娱协奖媒体人大点评 – Astro 本地圈
花名在外 总和冠军擦肩而过符琼音被封“二奶”
2009年11月09日- 符瓊音‧老二命- 幻燈片顯示- 專題潮區- 娛樂
2005年TVB8全球华人新秀歌唱大赛选手介绍
“绯闻男女”大唱丰收曾国辉大热夺冠，符琼音“二奶命”显灵！ – 〖 新闻报 ...

External links 
Pink Jukebox – Special official site

Living people
Malaysian people of Chinese descent
Malaysian expatriates in Taiwan
21st-century Malaysian women singers
1984 births